Edward Borein (1872–1945) was an American etcher and painter from California. His artwork depicted Spanish Colonial California, the Old West, and Mexico.

Early life
Borein was born in 1872 in San Leandro, California. His maternal grandfather was "one of the most famous horsemen in Alta California", and his father worked for the sheriff of Alameda County.

Borein grew up as a vaquero on the Jesus Maria Rancho (later known as Camp Cooke). He studied art in New York City, where he became friends with Will Rogers, and in Paris. He was primarily trained as an illustrator.

Career
Borein began his career as a cowboy in the 1893. He worked on the land for two decades.

Borein became an etcher and a painter, and he opened a studio in El Paseo, Santa Barbara, California in 1921. He also taught etching at the Santa Barbara School of the Arts. His works of art were nostalgic artistic representations of the Western lifestyle. He depicted scenes of Spanish Colonial California, including Spanish missions. Another theme was the Old West, especially Native Americans and cowboys. His work was part of the painting event in the art competition at the 1932 Summer Olympics.

Borein maintained his friendship with Will Rogers, and he became friends with Charles Marion Russell, an Old West painter from Montana. According to The Los Angeles Times, "The three formed a triumvirate who depicted with picture and legend the West before the days of the fences."

Personal life, death and legacy
Borein married Lucile Maxwell in 1921. They resided in Santa Barbara, California.

Borein died of a heart attack on May 19, 1945 in Santa Barbara, at age 72. Some of his paintings and etchings are displayed in the Santa Barbara Historical Museum's Edward Borein Gallery. In 1971, he was inducted into the Hall of Great Westerners of the National Cowboy & Western Heritage Museum.

Further reading

References

1872 births
1945 deaths
People from San Leandro, California
Painters from California
American etchers
American male painters
20th-century American painters
Artists of the American West
Olympic competitors in art competitions
Artists from Santa Barbara, California
20th-century American male artists